Steffen Schäfer (born 1 May 1994) is a German professional footballer who most recently played as a centre-back for SC Verl.

Club career
On 26 August 2021, Schäfer signed a two-year contract with 3. Liga club SC Verl.

References

External links
 
 

1994 births
Footballers from Cologne
Living people
German footballers
Association football defenders
2. Bundesliga players
3. Liga players
Regionalliga players
Eredivisie players
1. FC Köln II players
1. FC Saarbrücken players
FSV Frankfurt players
1. FC Magdeburg players
VVV-Venlo players
SC Verl players
German expatriate footballers
German expatriate sportspeople in the Netherlands
Expatriate footballers in the Netherlands